Sir Ronald McMillan Bell QC (14 April 1914 – 27 February 1982) was a barrister and Conservative Member of Parliament in the United Kingdom, representing South Buckinghamshire from 1950 to 1974 and Beaconsfield from 1974 to 1982. He also briefly represented the Newport constituency from a by-election in May 1945 until the general election two months later.

He was appointed a Queen's Counsel in 1966 and was knighted in 1980.

Family and education
Born in Cardiff, the younger son of John Bell, the young Bell was educated at Cardiff High School and Magdalen College, Oxford, graduating BA in 1936 and MA in 1941. In 1935, he was first Secretary and later Treasurer of the Oxford Union Society, and was also President of the Oxford University Conservative Association. In 1954 he married Elizabeth Audrey, eldest daughter of Kenneth Gossell MC, of Burwash, Sussex, and by her had two sons, Andrew and Robert, and two daughters, Fiona and Lucinda. Lady Bell died on 13 May 2014, aged 86.

Military and civilian life
In 1938, Bell was called to the Bar from Gray's Inn, London, and then served in the Royal Navy Volunteer Reserve from 1939 to 1946, during the Second World War. On 14 August 1940 he was promoted from Sub-Lieutenant to Lieutenant. After demobilisation he returned to practise as a barrister in London and on the South-Eastern Circuit. He took silk (became a Queen's Counsel) in 1966. In 1975, he was appointed as a member of Court of the University of Reading.

Political career
Bell had unsuccessfully contested the Caerphilly Division of Glamorgan at a by-election in 1938, but was elected as Conservative Member of Parliament for Newport at a by-election in May 1945. He lost that seat just two months later, at the general election in July 1945.

He was a member of Paddington Borough Council in London from 1947 to 1949, and was elected as Conservative MP for South Buckinghamshire at the 1950 general election. When that constituency was abolished, with effect from the February 1974 general election, he was elected for the new Beaconsfield from 1974. That year, he became a member of the Parliamentary Select committee on European Legislation.

Monday Club and rebellion against Edward Heath
Bell was an early (1962) and very active senior member of the Conservative Monday Club, and led the rebels in the House of Commons against the Race Relations Act 1965 and the subsequent extension by the Race Relations Act 1968. He argued against the importing of a new law affecting freedom of speech, and freedom to employ whoever one wishes, and, supported by Enoch Powell, said the Bill made "very deep and damaging encroachments into the proper sphere of personal decision". He also felt that the Bill was an effort to achieve unwarranted equality, and that it was "concerned solely and exclusively with the intention to achieve social equality".

In a vote on 22 December 1964, Bell was one of the 91 Tory MPs to vote in favour of the abolition of the death penalty.

On May Day 1970, he was one of the principal politicians to speak at the Monday Club's "Law and Liberty" rally in Trafalgar Square, London, in opposition to the "Stop the Seventy Tour" campaign aimed at stopping that year's South African cricket tour.

Bell was still a member of the Monday Club's Executive Council in 1971 and 1972; and in September 1972 he was a principal speaker at the club's "Halt Immigration Now!" rally in Westminster Central Hall, following which a resolution was passed calling upon the government to halt all immigration, repeal the Race Relations Act, and start a full repatriation scheme. That was delivered to Edward Heath, then Prime Minister, who said that the government had no intention of repealing the Act.

In 1972, Bell and Powell were the leaders of an open rebellion against the leadership of Edward Heath, who retaliated against Bell by attempting to have him replaced as the Tory candidate for Beaconsfield by Michael Heseltine, whose own seat at Tavistock was due for abolition in the current round of boundary changes and agreed to seek the nomination. A struggle within the local Conservative association ensued in which Bell's campaign was successfully masterminded by Hugh Simmonds, chairman of the Young Conservatives.

Bell was opposed to the entry of Ugandan Asians into Britain, stating that "They (Ugandan Asians) were either born in India or retain a close connection with India, they have no connection to Britain by either blood or residence."

In January 1973, Bell and Powell were opponents of Heath's Counter-Inflation Bill, with Bell arguing that prices and incomes policies were incompatible with the British way of life and were not Conservative measures. At the same time, Nicholas Ridley complained that what was needed was a "proper economic policy", and Richard Body stated that the real cause of inflation was too much government spending.

In 1975, Bell supported Margaret Thatcher's successful bid to lead the party, having firstly voted for Sir Hugh Fraser against Edward Heath.

Death

Ronald Bell died of a heart attack in his office in the House of Commons on 27 February 1982. Earlier that day he had taken the chair at an anti-Common Market rally in London.

Honours
Queen's Counsel, 20 April 1966
Knight Bachelor, 19 February 1980

Publications
 Bell, Ronald, Crown Proceedings, London, 1948

References

Further reading
 Robert Copping, The Story of the Monday Club - The First Decade (Current Affairs Information Service, Ilford, Essex, April 1972)
 Robert Copping, The Monday Club - Crisis and After (CAIS, Ilford, Essex, May 1975), pp. 6 and 16

External links
 

1914 births
1982 deaths
20th-century English lawyers
Alumni of Magdalen College, Oxford
Conservative Party (UK) MPs for English constituencies
Conservative Party (UK) MPs for Welsh constituencies
Conservative Party (UK) councillors
English barristers
Knights Bachelor
Members of Gray's Inn
Members of Paddington Metropolitan Borough Council
Politicians awarded knighthoods
Politics of Newport, Wales
Presidents of the Oxford University Conservative Association
Royal Naval Volunteer Reserve personnel of World War II
UK MPs 1935–1945
UK MPs 1950–1951
UK MPs 1951–1955
UK MPs 1955–1959
UK MPs 1959–1964
UK MPs 1964–1966
UK MPs 1966–1970
UK MPs 1970–1974
UK MPs 1974
UK MPs 1974–1979
UK MPs 1979–1983
Welsh King's Counsel